The voiced palatal implosive is a type of consonantal sound, used in some spoken languages. Typographically, the IPA symbol is a dotless lowercase letter j with a horizontal stroke (the symbol for the voiced palatal stop) and a rightward hook (the diacritic for implosives).

Features
Features of the voiced palatal implosive:

Occurrence

See also
 List of phonetics topics
 Voiceless palatal implosive

Notes

References

External links
 

Implosives
Central consonants
Voiced oral consonants
Palatal consonants